S. J. Goldsmith (born Shmuel Yosef Goldshmidt; 18 April 1910 – 18 January 1995), also known as Sam Goldsmith, was a journalist, author, and editor of Lithuanian Jewish heritage in the European Jewish press and English press.

Early life and education
Goldsmith was born in Jonava, Lithuania on April 18, 1910 He graduated from the Hebrew high school ('Schwabes') in Kaunas and from the Vytautas Magnus University in Kaunas.

His early career was in the Jewish press of Eastern Europe, writing for the daily Yiddishe Shtimme (The Jewish Voice). From 1934 to 1939 he wrote for Hayntike Nayes (Today's News), the paper's evening edition, becoming its editor in 1933. He relocated to London in 1939.

In England
From 1939, he reported and wrote op-eds for the Hebrew daily newspaper HaBoker in Tel Aviv, and for the British Sunday paper Reynold's News. As a British war correspondent he was the first journalist to enter the Bergen-Belsen camp after liberation and among the first in Dachau. He covered the Belsen Trial in Lüneburg (1945) and the Nuremberg Trials (1945-6) as a British war-correspondent.

Between 1958 and 1975 he served as European editor for the Jewish Telegraphic Agency. He was a prolific freelance contributor to various newspapers and journals, in several languages. During 1975–82, he wrote features for The Times, introducing aspects of Jewish ideas, culture, and politics to the British public. Among the causes he promoted were Hebrew language education in the Diaspora with the fostering of bilingualism, the rights of Soviet Jewry (during the eighties).

He was a founding member and chairman of the London branch of the World Hebrew Union. He was also well-known as an expert in its classic Yiddish language and literature. He was one of the speakers at the fifth European Conference on Yiddish culture which took place in London in 1966.

Bibliography

Books
Goldsmith published books in both English and Hebrew, including five collections of essays. His works include:
 Library of Congress catalogue no 62-21943

As editor

Personal life
He married Sonia Minsky, economist and teacher, in Kaunas in 1939. Their daughter is the British ancient historian  Professor Tessa Rajak.

Notes

References

Sources
Obituary, The Times, 11 Feb 1995
Obituary, The Daily Telegraph, 3 Feb 1995
Obituary, The Jewish Chronicle, 21 Feb 1995
Obituary, The Hampstead and Highgate Express, 27 Jan 1995

1915 births
1995 deaths
Jewish writers
Lithuanian journalists
People from Jonava
Lithuanian emigrants to the United Kingdom
British people of Lithuanian-Jewish descent
Lithuanian Jews
British Jews
British Home Guard soldiers
20th-century journalists